"Famous Last Words" is a song by the British group Tears for Fears, originally released on their 1989 album The Seeds of Love. It was released (by the record company without the band's involvement) as the fourth and final single from the album in 1990 and peaked at #83 in the UK.

The single was released on various formats including 7" and 12" vinyl, a limited edition 12" vinyl picture disc (only 10,000 copies were pressed, and each copy is numbered), and a limited edition CD-Single (only 5000 copies were pressed, and each copy is numbered). 

A promo video was made for the single; this consisted mainly of performance footage from the Going To California live video overdubbed with the studio version of the song and additional video imagery added. When performed live in 1990, the band would often segue from "Famous Last Words" into a rendition of "When The Saints Go Marching In".

Track listing
7" single (IDEA 15)
 "Famous Last Words"
 "Mothers Talk" (US remix)

12" vinyl (IDEAT 15 / IDPIC 15) and CD Single (IDECD 15)
 "Famous Last Words"
 "Mothers Talk" (US remix)
 "Listen"

Personnel 
 Roland Orzabal - Vocals, Guitar
 Curt Smith - Bass
 Jon Hassel - Trumpet
 Simon Phillips - Drums
 Nicky Holland - Piano, Kurtzweil Strings
 Dave Bascombe - Producer

References

1990 singles
Tears for Fears songs
Songs written by Roland Orzabal
Songs written by Nicky Holland
1989 songs
Fontana Records singles
Songs about nuclear war and weapons